Tical 2000: Judgement Day is the second studio album by American rapper and Wu-Tang Clan member Method Man. It was released on November 17, 1998, by Def Jam Recordings. The album's title and overall theme were heavily influenced by the apocalypse theories surrounding the forthcoming end of the second millennium. Judgement Day features production from RZA, True Master, Inspectah Deck, 4th Disciple,  Erick Sermon, Havoc, and Trackmasters, among others.  The album also features a multitude of guest appearances from artists such as Redman, Left Eye, Mobb Deep, D'Angelo and various Wu-Tang Clan members and affiliates such as Streetlife, who appears on seven of the album's twenty-eight tracks.

Commercial performance
Tical 2000: Judgement Day debuted at number two on the US Billboard 200 and number one on the US Top R&B/Hip-Hop Albums charts, selling 411,000 copies in its first week. Upon its release, the album received mostly favorable reviews from music critics, though several disapproved of its over-abundance of skits. As of December 16, 1998, the album was certified platinum by the Recording Industry Association of America (RIAA) for sales of over one million copies in the United States. As of October 2009, the album has 1,605,000 copies in the United States.

Track listing

Personnel 

 Method Man - performer, producer, 
 RZA - producer, performer, executive producer, engineer
 Streetlife - performer
 Left Eye - performer
 Cappadonna - performer
 Inspectah Deck - producer, performer
 4th Disciple - producer
 Prince Paul - producer
 Havoc - producer
 Qur'an Goodman, Trackmasters - producer
 Erick Sermon - producer
 Allah Mathematics - producer 
 Jeff Trotter - A&R executive, mastering
 Donald Trump - performer

Charts

Weekly charts

Year-end charts

Certifications

References

1998 albums
Albums produced by Erick Sermon
Albums produced by True Master
Albums produced by RZA
Method Man albums
Sequel albums
Albums produced by 4th Disciple
Def Jam Recordings albums